Kantar cue bids are a bridge convention. After the bidding is opened at the one level, and there is a suit overcall in the direct seat, a cue bid of the opponent's suit denotes a 3 suited hand with 8+ points, a singleton or void in the opponent's suit, and 4+ cards in every other suit. It was invented by American player Eddie Kantar.

This replaces the traditional use for such a bid, which is to show a limit raise or better in opener's suit.

Examples

In the sequence , the cue bid of 2 denotes a 5-4-4-0 or 4-4-4-1 hand with a singleton or void in spades, as well as 8+ high card points.

References 

Bridge conventions